The EMD SW1000 is a model of 4 axle diesel switcher locomotives built by General Motors Electro-Motive Division between June 1966 and October 1972. Power was provided by an EMD 645E 8-cylinder engine which generated . Over one-third of SW1000 production went to the Burlington Northern Railroad.

History 
The SW1000 was taller than previous EMD switchers, which posed a problem for industrial customers: at many facilities, tight clearances existed, and the SW1000 exceeded them. As a result, most production went to railroads, not industries. EMD corrected this problem with the SW1001, which was an SW1000 with its height and walkways lowered for better clearance.

114 EMD SW1000 units were built for railroads and industrial operations in the United States. One unit was exported to Jamaica for a mining operation and 4 units were exported to industrial operators in Mexico. 

Currently, 2 EMD SW1000 units are owned and operated by VIA Rail Canada in the Montreal Maintenance Centre.

Preservation
Around August 2022, Oregon Rail Heritage Center acquired former BNSF SW1000 #3613 (former BN #388).

SW1000 Locomotives as built by EMD

External links

See also
 List of GM-EMD locomotives

References 

 
 
 Diesel Era Volume 3 Number 1 January/February 1992 pp37–49

SW1000
B-B locomotives
Diesel-electric locomotives of the United States
Railway locomotives introduced in 1966
Standard gauge locomotives of the United States
Standard gauge locomotives of Mexico
Standard gauge locomotives of Jamaica
Standard gauge locomotives of South Korea
Diesel-electric locomotives of Mexico
Diesel-electric locomotives of Jamaica
Diesel-electric locomotives of South Korea

Shunting locomotives